Voulgaris, also transliterated as Bulgaris, is a Greek surname. Per Stefanos Voulgaris, who printed in 2016 the "Family chronicles the Voulgaris family" (of Corfu), a genealogical book written in Venetian Corfu, which cites a 15th-century testament of Stefanos Voulgaris claiming that the founding fathers of the family were Stefan Eleazar and Tervel, who were "kings of the Triballi". In these family chronicles the author claims Bulgarian royal roots and connects the roots of the "Voulgaris family of Saint Spyridon of Corfu" to the "barbarian peoples" from Volga river, who "finally settled in Moesia near the Haemus mountains". After all, in his escape to the southwest, it was the Serbian despot Stefan Lazarevic (Stefan Eliazar) who was singled out as the founder of the Bulgari family from Corfu. Through the Peloponnese, he headed to Morea and from there settled on the Ottoman-free Ionian island. 

The author Stefanos Voulgaris has claimed that their family tree is well-traced and that the Voulgaris family of Corfu is unrelated to the Voulgaris family of the founder of Bulgari company, Sotirios Voulgaris.

Notable people with the surname include:

 From the Voulgaris family of Corfu (el)
  (1634–after 1684), Greek theologian and physician
 , 17th-century Greek writer, brother of the former
 Eugenios Voulgaris (1716–1806), Greek Orthodox educator and Eastern Orthodox bishop
 Stamatis Voulgaris (1774–1842), Green urban planner
From the Voulgaris family of Epirus of Aromanian origin
 Sotirios Voulgaris (1857–1932), Greek jeweller, founder of the Bulgari company
 From the Voulgaris family of Hydra (el)
 Dimitrios Voulgaris (1802–1878), Greek revolutionary and Prime Minister of Greece
 Petros Voulgaris (1884–1957), Greek admiral and Prime Minister of Greece
 Other people named Voulgaris
  (1836–1887), Greek stage actor
 Pantelis Voulgaris (born 1940), Greek film director and screenwriter
 Haralabos Voulgaris (born c. 1975), Canadian professional gambler

References

Greek-language surnames
Surnames
Ethnonymic surnames